Jackson Township, population 11,012, is one of nine townships in Union County, North Carolina. This township includes the towns of Waxhaw and Mineral Springs and are located on the north side.

Geography
The northern part of the township is drained by Twelvemile Creek and its tributaries, Lee Branch, Little Twelvemile Creek, and Blythe Creek.  The southwest side is drained by Waxhaw Creek.  The northwestern side is drained by Rone Branch.

References

Townships in Union County, North Carolina
Townships in North Carolina